Dandachi is an Arabic surname. Notable people with the surname include:

 Abdelrazak al-Restom al-Dandachi (1899–1935), Syrian intellectual and activist
 Ali al-Dandachi (1906–2000), Syrian Scout vice president

Arabic-language surnames